Eupithecia carneata is a moth in the family Geometridae first described by James Halliday McDunnough in 1946. It is found in the US states of Utah and Arizona.

The wingspan is about 17 mm. Adults have been recorded on wing in August and September.

References

Moths described in 1946
carneata
Moths of North America